Dell Lott Hollow is a canyon, mostly within the Fishlake National Forest, on the southeast edge of the Pavant Range in southwest Sevier County, Utah, United States.

Dell Lott Hollow has the name of Dell Lott, a local lumberman.

See also

 List of canyons and gorges in Utah

References

Canyons and gorges of Utah
Landforms of Sevier County, Utah
Fishlake National Forest